Paweł Golański (born 12 October 1982 in Łódź), is a Polish former footballer who played as a defender.

Career

Club
In July 2007 he signed a three-year contract with Steaua București, with a reported transfer fee of around 1,000,000 euros.

In August 2011, he was loaned to ŁKS Łódź on a half-year deal.

International goals
Scores and results list Poland's goal tally first. "Score" column indicates the score after the player's goal.

Honours

Club
ASA Târgu Mureș
Romanian Supercup: 2015

Country
Poland U-18
U-18 European Championship: 2001

References

External links
 
 
 
 
 

1982 births
Living people
Polish footballers
ŁKS Łódź players
Korona Kielce players
FC Steaua București players
ASA 2013 Târgu Mureș players
Górnik Zabrze players
Poland international footballers
Footballers from Łódź
Polish expatriate footballers
Polish expatriate sportspeople in Romania
Liga I players
UEFA Euro 2008 players
Expatriate footballers in Romania
Ekstraklasa players
Association football defenders